Sam Hall (born 28 December 1988) is an Australian freestyle skier. He competed at the 2014 Winter Olympics in Sochi.

References

1988 births
Freestyle skiers at the 2014 Winter Olympics
Living people
Olympic freestyle skiers of Australia
Australian male freestyle skiers
Sportsmen from New South Wales